Tudor's Biscuit World is a restaurant chain and franchise based in Huntington, West Virginia, most commonly found in West Virginia. Many West Virginia locations share a building with Gino's Pizza and Spaghetti, although the chain is more extensive than Gino's (which is exclusive to West Virginia), having locations in southern Ohio and eastern Kentucky. In 2016 a franchise was opened in Panama City, Florida. 

Tudor's serves biscuits, biscuit sandwiches, homestyle breakfasts and dinners, muffins, and several side dishes. The chain was originally based in Charleston, West Virginia and many of the biscuit sandwiches are named for sports teams of interest in that area, including teams at Marshall University, West Virginia University, and The University of Charleston.

History
Tudor's Biscuit World was the original idea and concept of Bill and Mae Tudor and their son John Tudor. Bill and Mae opened the first Tudors on Washington Street in Charleston, West Virginia, in 1980. Their son John joined them two months later after graduating from East Carolina University. They opened more stores in the Charleston and Huntington areas, and began selling franchises. In 1986, Bill Tudor died and John and his mother continued to grow the business with the addition of Oshel Craigo as their new franchise partner.

References

External links

Companies based in West Virginia
Regional restaurant chains in the United States
Restaurants in West Virginia
Restaurant franchises
Restaurants established in 1980
1980 establishments in West Virginia